The following is a list of Eredivisie hat-tricks for Eredivisie, the highest level of professional football in the Netherlands.

List

References

hat-tricks
hat-tricks
Eredivisie